Jaroslav Humpál (born 4 February 1916; date of death unknown) was a Czechoslovak canoeist who competed in the 1936 Summer Olympics. In 1936 he and his partner Zdeněk Černický finished eighth in the K-2 10000 m event.

References
Sports-reference.com profile

1916 births
Canoeists at the 1936 Summer Olympics
Czechoslovak male canoeists
Olympic canoeists of Czechoslovakia
Year of death missing